HMS Heather was a  of the Royal Navy.

References

Flower-class corvettes of the Royal Navy
1940 ships
Ships built by Harland and Wolff